Wakata may refer to:
Koichi Wakata
6208 Wakata